Alex Bryce (born 22 May 1944) is a Scottish former footballer, who played for Third Lanark, Clyde, Dundee, Falkirk and Cowdenbeath.

References 

1944 births
Living people
Footballers from Glasgow
Association football midfielders
Scottish footballers
Third Lanark A.C. players
Clyde F.C. players
Dundee F.C. players
Falkirk F.C. players
Cowdenbeath F.C. players
Scottish Football League players